The 202nd New York State Legislature, consisting of the New York State Senate and the New York State Assembly, met from January 4, 2017, to December 31, 2018, during the seventh and eighth years of Andrew Cuomo's governorship, in Albany

State Senate
At the beginning of this Legislature, the Senate had 31 Republicans and 32 Democrats. Dem. Simcha Felder caucused with Republicans. Unsatisfied with their own party's leadership, eight Democrats had formed previously the Independent Democratic Conference which cooperated with the Republicans. In April 2018, the IDC was dissolved and the dissenters returned to the Democratic conference. Subsequently, Rep. Thomas Croci abandoned his seat without resigning, which left the Senate de facto tied.

Senators
The asterisk (*) denotes members of the previous Legislature who continued in office as members of this Legislature. Jim Tedisco changed from the Assembly to the Senate at the beginning of this Legislature. Assembly members Brian P. Kavanagh, Luis R. Sepúlveda and Shelley Mayer were elected to fill vacancies in the Senate.

Note: For brevity, the chairmanships omit the words "...the Committee on (the)..."

Employees
 Secretary: ?

State Assembly

Assembly members
The asterisk (*) denotes members of the previous Legislature who continued in office as members of this Legislature.

Note: For brevity, the chairmanships omit the words "...the Committee on (the)..."

Employees
 Secretary: ?

References

Sources
 Senate election results at NYS Board of Elections
 Assembly election results at NYS Board of Elections
 26th Senate D. special election result at NYS Board of Elections
 30th Senate D. special election result at NYS Board of Elections
 9th Assembly D. special election at NYS Board of Elections
 27th and 71st Assembly D. special election at NYS Board of Elections
 5th, 10th, 17th, 39th, 74th, 80th, 102nd, 107th and 142nd Assembly D.; and 32nd and 37th Senate D. special election results at NYS Board of Elections

201
2017 politics in New York (state)
2018 politics in New York (state)
Independent Democratic Conference
2017 in New York (state)
2018 in New York (state)
2017 U.S. legislative sessions
2018 U.S. legislative sessions